Four Hearts may refer to:

Four Hearts, a 1939 Argentine film
Four Hearts, a 1941 Soviet film
4 Hearts, a 2009 Portuguese film